Two ships of the Royal Navy have borne the name HMS Hampton Court:

  was a 70-gun third rate ship of the line launched in 1678 captured by France in 1707 and sold to Spain in 1712.
  was a 70-gun third rate ship of the line launched in 1709 rebuilt in 1744 as a 64-gun. She was broken up in 1774.

References

 

Royal Navy ship names